Drosimomyia is a genus of flies in the family Stratiomyidae.

Species
Drosimomyia baueri James, 1950
Drosimomyia mercurialis Lindner, 1939
Drosimomyia natalensis Kertész, 1916
Drosimomyia oldroydi James, 1949

References

Stratiomyidae
Brachycera genera
Taxa named by Kálmán Kertész
Diptera of Africa
Diptera of Australasia